Star World Premiere HD was an 24-hour English language television channel, launched on 24 September 2013. It is owned by Disney Star and Disney Networks Group Asia Pacific, two fully owned subsidiaries of The Walt Disney Company. The channel primarily airs popular shows from the United States along with United Kingdom to appeal to the English-speaking population of India.
 
Originally supposed to shut down on 30 November 2021, the shutdown of Star World Premiere among some other Disney channels has not taken place yet and delayed until further notice due to the delay of TRAI's new tariff rules. The channel would eventually close on 14 March 2023, along with Star World and Star World HD.

History
Star World Premiere was launched in India on 24 September 2013. Broadcasting in HD only, the premium ad-free channel was available only by A la carte pay television.

The channel was launched as a companion to Star World, to air the latest seasons of popular English shows in India within 24 hours of their US telecast. As part of the penetrative marketing strategies for the then new channel, premiere episodes of the latest seasons of shows like Glee, Agents of S.H.I.E.L.D, Sleepy Hollow, The Blacklist etc. were aired in India a day before their US broadcast.

In October 2021, it was reported that Star India's this channel along with Star World (India) (both SD and HD feed) will be shut down on 30 November 2021, the shutdown of Star World Premiere among some other Disney channels has not taken place yet and delayed until further notice due to the delay of TRAI's new tariff rules.

The channel eventually closed on 14 March 2023.

International distribution
Star World Premiere was launched in Sri Lanka in 2015, replacing Star Movies HD. The Sri Lankan market was initially considered to be  profitable due to the lack of American programming broadcasters in the country, but the channel was later pulled out of the region due to the lack of viewership.

Programming

The channel mainly aired shows from the US, along with a few popular British series. A few of these shows were later aired in syndication on Star World.

References

External links
STAR World Premiere

English-language television stations in India
Television channels and stations established in 2013 
Television channels and stations disestablished in 2023
Defunct television channels in India
Disney Star